John Charles de la Poer Beresford, 7th Marquess of Waterford (6 January 1901 – 25 September 1934), was an Irish peer.

Biography
John Beresford was the son of Henry Beresford, 6th Marquess of Waterford, and Lady Beatrix Frances Petty-FitzMaurice. He served as a Second Lieutenant in the Royal Regiment of Horse Guards, but died at age 33 in a shooting accident in the gun room at the family seat, Curraghmore, in County Waterford.

Family
Lord Waterford married Juliet Mary Lindsay, daughter of Major David Balcarres Lindsay and Grace Maud Miller, on 14 October 1930. They had two children:
 John Hubert de la Poer Beresford, who would eventually succeed as the 8th Marquess of Waterford (14 July 1933 – 12 February 2015)
 Lord Patrick Tristam de la Poer Beresford (16 June 1934 – 18 March 2020)

References

External links
 

1901 births
1934 deaths
7
Deaths by firearm in the Republic of Ireland
Firearm accident victims
Accidental deaths in the Republic of Ireland
Royal Horse Guards officers